The McMurdo Dry Valleys are a row of largely snow-free valleys in Antarctica, located within Victoria Land west of McMurdo Sound. The Dry Valleys experience extremely low humidity and surrounding mountains prevent the flow of ice from nearby glaciers. The rocks here are granites and gneisses, and glacial tills dot this bedrock landscape, with loose gravel covering the ground. It is one of the driest places on Earth and has not seen rain for nearly two million years.

The region is one of the world's most extreme deserts, and includes many features including Lake Vida, a saline lake, and the Onyx River, a meltwater stream and Antarctica's longest river. Although no living organisms have been found in the permafrost here, endolithic photosynthetic bacteria have been found living in the relatively moist interior of rocks, and anaerobic bacteria, with a metabolism based on iron and sulfur, live under the Taylor Glacier.

The valleys are located within the McMurdo Valleys Antarctic Specially Managed Area (ASMA-2).

Climate

The Dry Valleys are so named because of their extremely low humidity and lack of snow or ice cover. They are also dry because, in this location, the mountains are sufficiently high that they block seaward-flowing ice from the East Antarctic Ice Sheet from reaching the Ross Sea. At , the valleys constitute around 0.03% of the continent and form the largest ice-free region in Antarctica. The valley floors are covered with loose gravel, in which ice wedge polygonal patterned ground may be observed.

The unique conditions in the Dry Valleys are caused, in part, by katabatic winds; these occur when cold, dense air is pulled downhill by the force of gravity. The dry wind evaporates the snow rapidly and little melts into the soil. During the summer, this process can take only hours.

Another important factor is a lack of precipitation. This contributes to the low humidity of the area.

For several weeks in the summer, the temperature increases enough to allow for glacial melt, which causes small freshwater streams to form. These streams feed the lakes at the base of the valleys, which do not have outflow to the sea, causing them to become highly saline.

Geology

The Taylor and Wright Valleys are major ice-free valleys within the Transantarctic Mountains. These "dry valleys" include hummocky moraines, with frozen lakes, saline ponds, sand dunes, and meltwater streams. Basement rocks include the Late Precambrian or Early Palaeozoic Skelton Group metamorphic rocks, primarily the Asgard Formation, which is a medium-high-grade marble and calc schist. The Palaeozoic Granite Harbour intrusives include granitoid plutons and dykes, which intruded into the metasedimentary Skelton Group in the Late Cambrian-Early Ordovician during the Ross orogeny. The basement complex is overlain by the Jurassic Beacon Supergroup, which is itself intruded by Ferrar Dolerite sheets and sills. The McMurdo Volcanic Group intrudes, or is interbedded with, the Taylor and Wright Valleys' moraines as basaltic cinder cones and lava flows. These basalts have ages between 2.1 and 4.4 Ma. The Dry Valley Drilling Project (1971–75) determined the Pleistocene layer within the Taylor Valley was between 137 and 275 m thick, and composed of interbedded sandstones, pebble conglomerates, and laminated silty mudstones. This Pleistocene layer disconformably overlies Pliocene and Miocene diamictites.

Life

Endolithic bacteria have been found living in the Dry Valleys, sheltered from the dry air in the relatively moist interior of rocks.  Summer meltwater from the glaciers provides the primary source of soil nutrients. Scientists consider the Dry Valleys perhaps the closest of any terrestrial environment to the planet Mars, and thus an important source of insights into possible extraterrestrial life.

Anaerobic bacteria whose metabolism is based on iron and sulfur live in sub-freezing temperatures under the Taylor Glacier.

It was previously thought that  algae were staining the red ice emerging at Blood Falls but it is now known that the staining is caused by high levels of iron oxide.

Canadian and American researchers conducted a field expedition in 2013 to University Valley in order to examine the microbial population and to test a drill designed for sampling on Mars in the permafrost of the driest parts of the valleys, the areas most analogous to the Martian surface. They found no living organisms in the permafrost, the first location on the planet visited by humans with no active microbial life. 

In 2014, drones were used in the McMurdo Dry Valleys by a team of scientists from Auckland University of Technology (AUT) to create baseline maps of the vegetation. In 2015, the New Zealand Antarctic Research Institute granted funding to AUT to develop methods for operating unmanned aerial vehicles. Over successive summer seasons in Antarctica, the AUT team created three dimensional maps with sub-centimeter resolution, which are now used as baselines.     

Part of the Valleys was designated an environmentally protected area in 2004.

Major geographic features

Valleys
 Alatna Valley (sometimes incorrectly spelled Atlanta Valley) is the northernmost, north of Benson Glacier.

From north to south, the three main valleys are
 Victoria Valley (between St. Johns Range in the north and Olympus Range in the south)
 Wright Valley (between Olympus Range in the north and Asgard Range in the south)
 Taylor Valley (between Asgard Range in the north and Kukri Hills in the south)

West of Victoria Valley are, from north to south,
 Barwick Valley
 Balham Valley
 McKelvey Valley

Stretching south from Balham Valley are, from west to east:
 Priscu Valley
 Wall Valley
 Virginia Valley
 Stuiver Valley

West of Taylor Valley is
 Pearse Valley (sometimes incorrectly spelled Pearce Valley).

Further south, between Royal Society Range in the west and the west coast of McMurdo Sound at the lobe of Koettlitz Glacier are, from north to south:
 Garwood Valley
 Marshall Valley
 Miers Valley

Glaciers 
 Clark

Wright Valley 
 Wright Upper
 Wright Lower

Taylor Valley 
 Rhone
 Suess
 Hughes
 Taylor
 Canada
 Commonwealth
 Howard
 Doran

Lakes
Some of the lakes of the Dry Valleys rank among the world's most saline lakes, with a higher salinity than Lake Assal or the Dead Sea. The most saline of all is small Don Juan Pond.
 Lake Vida (Victoria Valley)
 Lake Thomas (Victoria Valley)
 Lake Vanda (Wright Valley)
 Lake Brownworth (Wright Valley) (freshwater)
 Don Juan Pond (Wright Valley)
 Lake Fryxell (Taylor Valley)
 Lake Hoare (Taylor Valley)
 Lake Chad (Taylor Valley)
 Parera Pond (Taylor Valley) (freshwater)
 Lake Bonney (Taylor Valley)
 Lake Joyce (Pearse Valley)
 Lake Garwood (Garwood Valley)
 Lake Miers (Miers Valley)

Former lakes 
 Lake Washburn (Taylor Valley)

Rivers
 Kite Stream (Victoria Valley)
 Onyx River (Wright Valley)
 Doran Stream (Taylor Valley)
 Vincent Creek (Taylor Valley)
 Crescent Stream (Taylor Valley)
 Harnish Creek (Taylor Valley)
 Huey Creek (Taylor Valley)
 Lost Seal Stream (Taylor Valley)

Other
 Blood Falls, a feature caused by iron oxide causing a coloured water outflow from Taylor Glacier into West Lake Bonney
 Gargoyle Ridge, a ridge of eroded exposed rocks in Wright Valley
Airdevronsix Icefalls, a set of icefalls at the head of Wright Upper Glacier
Battleship Promontory, a sandstone promontory in Alatna Valley

See also
 Peter Doran
 John Charles Priscu
 Cristina Takacs-Vesbach

Further reading

References

External links

 Special Report: The McMurdo Dry Valleys, Antarctic Sun, January 26, 2003, 7–21.
 Virtual Tour of the Dry Valleys
 A long-term ecological research group is working in the area.
 Pictures from the Dry Valleys
 Satellite images
 Dry Valleys low altitude aerial videos

 
Valleys of Antarctica
Valleys of Victoria Land
Transantarctic Mountains
Antarctic Specially Managed Areas
Landforms of Victoria Land
Oases of Antarctica
Victoria Land